Miljoona Rock was a rock festival in Tuuri held annually since 2004.

Tuuri is a village in Töysä, a municipality of Finland.

Artists by year

2004

Scorpions, Leningrad Cowboys, Anssi Kela, Popeda, Miljoonasade, Jani Wickholm, Maija Vilkkumaa, Pizza Enrico

2005

Deep Purple, Jani Wickholm, Pelle Miljoona & Rockers, Kirka, Aino

2006

Lordi, Dio, Billy Idol, Normaali Homma!

2007

HIM, Scorpions, Eppu Normaali, Popeda, Neljä Ruusua, Jani Wickholm, Apulanta, Lauri Tähkä & Elonkerjuu, Normaali Homma!, Fakta Beat

2008

Nightwish, Twisted Sister, Jani Wickholm, Dingo, Movetron

2009

Viilto, Mustat Enkelit, Europe, Yö, Danny, Popeda, Paula Koivuniemi, Jani Wickholm, Scorpions, Eppu Normaali

2010

Lauri Tähkä & Elonkerjuu, The Rasmus, Herra Ylppö & Ihmiset, Kim Wilde, Alexander Rybak, Kivimetsän Druidi, D’Black, Dinturist, Mustat Enkelit, Hevisaurus

2011

Scorpions, Jenni Vartiainen, Negative, Flinch, Moottörin Jyrinä, Hevisaurus

References

External links
Official Miljoona Rock Website
Miljoona Rock 2006
 MiljoonaRock video
deep-purple.net
diorocks.com
Tickets

Töysä
Rock festivals in Finland
Recurring events established in 2004
Tourist attractions in South Ostrobothnia